Sosius can refer to:

Sosius of Pergamum, Hellenistic artist
Gaius Sosius, Roman politician
Quintus Sosius Senecio, Roman politician
Sossius (d. 305), deacon

See also

 
 Sosia gens